Compartment may refer to:

Biology
 Compartment (anatomy), a space of connective tissue between muscles
 Compartment (chemistry), in which different parts of the same protein serves different functions
 Compartment (development), fields of cells of distinct cell lineage, cell affinity, and genetic identity
 Compartment (pharmacokinetics), a defined and distinct volume of body fluids
 Cellular compartment, a closed part within a cell, surrounded by a membrane

Other uses
 Compartment coach, a railway car divided into separate areas or compartments, with no means of moving between them
 Compartment (ship), subdivision of the space within a ship
 Compartment (heraldry), the part of a coat of arms design which appears immediately below the shield
 Multi-compartment model, a type of mathematical model
 "Compartments", a song and album by José Feliciano
 Hidden compartment

See also
 
 
 Compartmentalization (disambiguation)
 Apartment
 Division (disambiguation)
 Section (disambiguation)